Carmarthen East and Dinefwr is a constituency of the House of Commons of the Parliament of the United Kingdom represented since 2010 by Jonathan Edwards of Plaid Cymru. It elects one Member of Parliament (MP) by the first past the post system of election. It was created in 1997, mostly from the former seat of Carmarthen.

The Carmarthen East and Dinefwr Senedd constituency was created with the same boundaries in 1999 (as an Assembly constituency).

Boundaries

The constituency is within the Carmarthenshire authority area, with Llanybydder, Llandovery and Llanfihangel-ar-Arth in the north, Llanfihangel-uwch-Gwili, Llanegwad, and Llandeilo in the central area, and Ammanford and Glanamman in the south.

Boundary changes for the 2010 general election introduced minor alterations, with the areas around Hermon and Llanpumsaint removed to the Carmarthen West and South Pembrokeshire constituency. These changes came into effect in 2007 for the National Assembly for Wales.

The constituency includes the whole of 41 Carmarthenshire communities (Abergwili; Ammanford; Betws; Cenarth; Cilycwm; Cwmamman; Cynwyl Gaeo; Dyffryn Cennen; Gorslas; Llanarthney; Llanddarog; Llanddeusant; Llandeilo; Llandovery; Llandybie; Llandyfaelog; Llanegwad; Llanfair-ar-y-bryn; Llanfihangel Aberbythych; Llanfihangel-ar-Arth; Llanfihangel Rhos-y-Corn; Llanfynydd; Llangadog; Llangathen; Llangeler; Llangunnor; Llangyndeyrn; Llanllawddog; Llanllwni; Llansadwrn; Llansawel; Llanwrda; Llanybydder; Llanycrwys; Manordeilo and Salem; Myddfai; Newcastle Emlyn; Pencarreg; Quarter Bach; St Ishmael; Talley).

Members of Parliament

Elections

Elections in the 1990s

Elections in the 2000s

Elections in the 2010s

Of the 65 rejected ballots:
44 were either unmarked or it was uncertain who the vote was for.
14 voted for more than one candidate.
7 had writing or a mark by which the voter could be identified.

Of the 145 rejected ballots:
123 were either unmarked or it was uncertain who the vote was for.
20 voted for more than one candidate.
2 had writing or a mark by which the voter could be identified.

Edwards was elected as a Plaid Cymru MP, but had the whip withdrawn by the party after he was arrested on suspicion of assault in May 2020.

See also
 Carmarthen East and Dinefwr (Senedd constituency)
 List of parliamentary constituencies in Dyfed
 List of parliamentary constituencies in Wales

References

External links 
nomis Constituency Profile for Carmarthen East and Dinefwr — presenting data from the ONS annual population survey and other official statistics.
Politics Resources (Election results from 1922 onwards)
Electoral Calculus (Election results from 1955 onwards)
2017 Election House Of Commons Library 2017 Election report
A Vision Of Britain Through Time (Constituency elector numbers)

Parliamentary constituencies in South Wales
Constituencies of the Parliament of the United Kingdom established in 1997
Districts of Carmarthenshire
Politics of Carmarthenshire